Ibrahim Haydari (Arabic:إبراهيم حيدري), an Iraqi sociologist (born in Baghdad, March 8, 1936). He has teaching experience as he taught sociology in the Institute of Social Ethnology at Free University of Berlin from 1972 to 1976, the Department of Sociology at College of Arts – University of Baghdad 1977–1980. He was also a visiting professor at the Institute of Social Ethnology at Free University of Berlin 1981 to 1982. He has a numerous publications.

Education and career 
Ibrahim Haydari was born in Kadhimiya, Baghdad on August 3, 1936. He completed elementary and middle school in Kadhimiya school, whereas he studied high school in Baghdad. He obtained a bachelor's degree in Literature from the Department of Sociology – College of Arts at University of Baghdad in 1962. Then, he earned his master's degree in Sociology from the University of Frankfurt, Germany in 1969. In 1974, he obtained his PhD in Social Ethnology from Free University of Berlin.

Haydari participated in many scientific Arab and International conferences in Berlin, Frankfurt, Baghdad, Basra, London, Beirut, Algeria, Annaba, Madrid and others. He wrote several books and translated many research papers in Arabic, German, and English languages.

Teaching career 

 1972-1976: Institute of Social Ethnology at Free University of Berlin.
 1977-1980: Department of Sociology, University of Baghdad
 1981-1982: Visiting professor – Institute of Social Ethnology at Free University of Berlin
 1983-1992: Professor at Institute of Sociology, University of Annaba, Algeria.

Publications 
Some of his works include the followings:

 Ubersetzung aus dem Arabischen mit Weirauch : Ali Al - Wardi, Soziologie des Nomadentums, Studie uber die Irakische Gesellschaft, Sozioligische Texte Nr. 73. Luchterhand, Verlag, Neuwied und Darmstadt 1972 (454S.) mit nachwort zu Ali AL- wardi (S. 453–447).
 Zur Soziologie des shiitischen Chiliasmus. Ein Beitrag zur Erforschung des Irakischen Passionsspiels, Islamkundliche Utersuchungen,Bd.31. Klaus Schwarz Verlag, Freiburg im Breisgau 1975, 274S.
 Die Ta ziya, das schiitische Passionsspeil im Lebanon. مجلة الجمعية الشرقية الأمريكية Suppl. III Franz Steiner Verlag, Wiesbaden 1977, S.430-437.
 Das Aulflosungsprozess des Beduinentums in Irak, in: Abhandlung des geographischen Insititut Anthropo-geographischie. Bd.33, Berlin1982 (S.139 – 1942)
 Beduinen im Zeichen des Erdols. Von F. Scholz, (Besprechung) in: Sozio-psyschologie, Nr Iv, Berlin 1984.
 The Retuals of Ashura, in: Ayatolahs, Sufis and Ideologies. Ed. By F. A. Jabar, P. 101-114 Saqi Book, London 2
 Fear of Reform,Muntada,Libya Human & political Development Forum, London, 02. 05. 2005
 Islam and Modernity,Islam21,Forum for Islamic Dialoque, London 12 Jan. 2007
 Theology and Sociology-Compatibility,Islam 21,Forum for Islamic Dialoque,London 11 May

References 

Iraqi scholars
Iraqi writers
Iraqi translators
21st-century Iraqi writers
1936 births
Living people